Kølle is a Norwegian surname. Notable people with the surname include:

Christian Kølle (1736–1814), a Norwegian educator
Catharine Hermine Kølle (1788–1859), a Norwegian adventurer and painter

See also
Kolle
Kölle

Norwegian-language surnames